The Pecan Street Festival is the common name for the Old Pecan Street Spring and Fall Arts Festival, a free, bi-annual juried fine art and arts and crafts festival held on 6th Street in Austin, Texas.

The festival was first held in Fall 1978.  The festival includes juried original artists and artisans featuring painting, sculpture, wood, glass, jewelers, pottery, mosaics, candles, original clothing, etc.; five stages of live music, dance and performing arts; vendors; children's carnival, petting zoo, and art classes.

History

This downtown Austin festival was originally dreamed up, produced, funded and had event insurance secured by entrepreneur Marcy Fletcher and artist Michael Wolverton.  It was a juried show that required artists and craftsmen to have actually produced the work they sold. The management was later handed over to French Smith III, and was later taken over through legal action by the Old Pecan Street Association in 1997. Roadstar Productions, Smith's company, continued to produce it for eight more years. In the fall of 2006, the Old Pecan Street Association selected Special Events Management to run the festival.

References

External links
Old Pecan Street Festival

Festivals in Austin, Texas
Street art festivals